Kolol or Kolal may refer to:
 Kolol, Dashtestan
 Kolol, Dashti
 Kolal, a village in the Debre Nazret municipality in Ethiopia